Titanoeca nivalis is a species of araneomorph spider in the family Titanoecidae. It has a Holarctic distribution.

References

Titanoecidae
Holarctic spiders
Spiders described in 1874